= Department of Public Welfare v. Hass (1958) =

Department of Public Welfare v. Haas, 15 Ill.2d 204 (1958), is a case in which the Illinois Supreme Court affirmed the lower court’s jurisdiction and ruling that the father of a child deemed “incompetent” must be responsible for the costs of his son’s care in a state institution, according to the Mental Health Code of Illinois. In their ruling, the higher court confirmed the constitutionality of the Mental Health Code and noted the lapse of the father in filing a timely administrative appeal.

== Background ==
Richard Haas was documented by the local school district as “incompetent.” Thus, the boy was deemed incapable of benefiting from a public school education. Therefore, he was denied a public school education. Before the enactment of Civil Rights, parents of children with disabilities were denied the right to advocate for their children's placements. As such, as of August 28, 1949, Richard was committed to Lincoln State School under the auspices of The Illinois Department of Public Welfare. There he was to learn Life Skills and more with the intention of contributing to society. As Richard had no personal resources to remunerate payment for his care, The Department (plaintiff) demanded payment from his father. E. Haas asserted that the Cook County Court did not have the jurisdiction to judge the case. He argued that the family payments deposited in the state treasury were redirected from his son's care to subsidizing the education of psychiatrists and for psychiatric research. The defendant claimed that this violated Section 13 of Article II of the Illinois Mental Health Code and both the 14th Amendment and the due process law clause of the U.S. Constitution. The Department requested a jury trial in the County Court of Cook County to enforce payment. The Department then requested a summary judgement in lieu of trial, which was granted. The subsequent ruling found favor for the Department. The defendant then appealed to the Illinois Supreme Court. This high court concurred with the county court, ruling in favor of the Department.

== Decision ==
The Cook County Court found in favor of the Department, citing a lapse in proper actions by the senior Haas in filing for a timely hearing regarding his inability to pay. Haas disputed the decision, claiming the county court's lack of jurisdiction to rule on a case involving more than $2,000 per the Code. He appealed to the Illinois Supreme Court. The Superior Court found that the County Court did have jurisdiction to rule on the case and reaffirmed the Cook County Court’s decisions (per section 9-23 of the Mental Health Code, allowing an extension of jurisdiction in this circumstance). In favor of the plaintiff, the Illinois Supreme Court ruled that the defendant, Haas, was liable for $2,040 and more for his son’s care.
